Olaf Fjalstad (2 April 188822 February 1971) was a Norwegian jurist and politician. He was born in Bamble; a son of priest John Fjalstad. He was a member of the Storting from 1928 to 1945. He served as stipendiary magistrate of Nedenes from 1937 to 1958. He was a brother-in-law of Fredrik Vogt.

References

1888 births
1971 deaths
People from Bamble
Norwegian jurists
Members of the Storting